Robert Gay may refer to:

 Robert Gay (MP) (died 1738), English MP
 Robert C. Gay (born 1951), general authority of The Church of Jesus Christ of Latter-day Saints
 Robert J. Gay, American palaeontologist
 Robert Marie Gay (1927–2016), Canadian-born Ugandan Roman Catholic prelate
 Robert Gay, singer on the rock opera, !Hero